H. Ward Wettlaufer (October 31, 1935 – March 31, 2016) was an American amateur golfer with numerous titles to his name, including the Eastern Amateur, two Porter Cup championships, North and South Amateur, and the Walker Cup as a member of the "unbeatable" 1959 U.S. team.

A native of Buffalo, New York, Wettlaufer served for 50 years since graduation from Hamilton College as an executive and CEO of a family business manufacturing and distributing commercial printing supplies.

Tournament wins
1953 International Junior Masters
1956 Tam O'Shanter World Amateur, Bermuda Amateur
1958 Eastern Amateur
1959 Eastern Amateur
1960 Porter Cup
1965 Porter Cup
1966 North and South Amateur, Georgia State Amateur, Atlanta Open
1990 Wild Dunes Senior Champion
1991 Wild Dunes Senior Champion
1995 Society of Seniors Medal Play

Other career highlights
Canadian Open, low amateur, 1956
NCAA Division I Men's Golf Championships, runner-up, 1956
Western Amateur, quarterfinalist, 1956
Tam O'Shanter World Amateur Championship, runner-up, 1957
U.S. Amateur, semifinalist, 1958
Carling Cup team member, 1958, 1960
NCAA First Team All-American, 1958, 1959
Masters Tournament, contestant, 1959–61
Insurance City Open, low amateur, 1960
U.S. Open, contestant, 1960, 1965
Walker Cup, alternate, 1966
Southern Amateur, runner-up, 1966
Country Club of Buffalo, Club Champion 22 times in five decades from the 1950s to 1990s
U.S. Senior Open, contestant, 1991
Greater Buffalo Sports Hall of Fame, 1995
Member of U.S. Senior Team Medal Play, 1996, winners
U.S. Senior Amateur Man of the Year, 1996
Top-10 ranked National Senior Amateur, four years

U.S. national team appearances
Amateur
Walker Cup: 1959 (winners)

References

American male golfers
Amateur golfers
Golfers from New York (state)
Hamilton College (New York) alumni
Sportspeople from Buffalo, New York
1935 births
2016 deaths